Millennium: Journal of International Studies is a peer-reviewed academic journal of International Relations. It is run by PhD and graduate students from the University of London and is based at the London School of Economics (LSE). Millennium is published by Sage Publications three times a year, in January, June and September.

History 
Millennium was established in 1971 by F. S. Northedge and a group of students from the Grimshaw Club. It is based at the LSE Department of International Relations.

Editorship 
Millennium has been a student-run journal since its foundation. Postgraduate students at the LSE continue to edit and manage the journal, with a new team editing each volume. Since 2020, PhD students from the wider University of London (UoL) have been able to attend the weekly held Editorial Board meetings and, since the 2022 elections, PhD students from UoL have been able to run for any of the editorial positions (editor, deputy editor, and reviews article editor)  The current editors for Vol. 52 are Albert Cullell Cano (LSE), Eva Leth Sørensen (LSE), and Shreya Bhattacharya (SOAS). This is the first time in the history of the journal that one of the elected editors is affiliated with an institution outside the LSE IR Department.

Abstracting and Indexing 
Millennium is abstracted and indexed in Current Abstracts, Current Contents/Arts & Humanities, International Bibliography of the Social Sciences, and the Social Sciences Citation Index. According to the Journal Citation Reports, its 2020 impact factor is 2.930, ranking it 24th out of 94 journals in the category International Relations.

Annual Symposium and Special Issue 
Every October, Millennium organises a symposium at the London School of Economics that forms the basis for a special issue, published as each volume's issue 3. The most recent symposium was on 'From Empires to Nation-States: Enduring Legacies and Historical Disjunctures' and took place on 31st October and 1st November, 2022.

The Northedge Essay Competition 
The Northedge Essay Competition was established in 1986 to commemorate the contribution of the late F. S. Northedge to the creation of Millennium. The winning essay received a cash prize and is considered for publication in the journal. The competition is open to any student who is currently pursuing or has recently completed a degree in International Relations or a related field. The essay may be part of a doctoral research project, an essay or dissertation submitted as part of a graduate degree course, a seminar paper or similar work.

References

External links 
 

International relations journals
SAGE Publishing academic journals
Publications established in 1971
English-language journals
Triannual journals
Academic journals edited by students